The women's triathlon was part of the Triathlon at the 2014 Commonwealth Games program. The competition was held on 24 July 2014 at Strathclyde Country Park in Glasgow.

Competition format
The race was held over the "international distance" (also called "Olympic distance") and consisted of  swimming,  road bicycling, and  road running.

Results
A total of 24 athletes participated.
Jodie Stimpson won the gold medal.

References

Triathlon at the 2014 Commonwealth Games
Commonwealth Games
2014 in women's sport